Wich Stand was a '50s-style coffee shop restaurant and diner in Los Angeles, California, featuring a tilting blue roof and , designed by architect Eldon Davis.

The Wich Stand had two locations in the Los Angeles area. One of the buildings still exists at the intersection of Slauson Avenue and Overhill Drive in View Park-Windsor Hills, an unincorporated affluent neighborhood of Los Angeles County near City of Inglewood that is encircled. It was known for its dart neon sign.

A food critic said its "plunging dart of a sign keeps it from spinning off into space," and it's a surviving preserved examples of Googie architecture, according to The Los Angeles Times.

The other was located within City of Los Angeles proper at the Northwest corner of Figueroa Street and Florence Avenue (as listed on menu and matchbook cover), which preceded the one "on the hill."

The Beach Boys
The Beach Boys lived in the area and wrote an unreleased song called "Wich Stand". The coffee shop also inspired another Beach Boys song, "Root Beer (Chug-a-Lug)", about "Cruisin' the A," which was driving the five miles between the A & W on Hawthorne Boulevard and the Wich Stand on Slauson.

Simply Wholesome

The Slauson Avenue location opened in 1957. It fell upon hard times in the early 1980s and was vandalized. The floors and ceilings were gutted after the diner closed in 1988. In 1989 it was declared a historic landmark by the Los Angeles County. In 1995 the building was completely refurbished and reopened as Simply Wholesome vegan restaurant and health food store.

See also
Beach Boys Historic Landmark, childhood home location in Hawthorne

References

External links
 Photos and design of Wich Stand
 The Wich Stand

 Simply Wholesome official site
 Cruisin’ to the Wich Stand – The Origins of Googie Design - ultraswank.net

Defunct restaurants in Los Angeles
Googie architecture in California
Restaurants established in 1957